Abū ʿAlī Muḥmmad b. al-Ḥasan b. al-Muẓaffar al-Ḥātimī (died Baghdad 26 April 998 CE [27 Rabīʿ II 388 AH]) was an Arabic-language scholar.

Works
His key works of which substantial portions survive are:
 al-Risāla al-mūḍiḥa [fī dḥikr sariḳāt Abi ’l-Ṭayyib al-Mutanabbī wa-saḳiṭ s̲h̲iʿrih], D̲j̲abhat al-adab, Munāẓarat Abī Alī al-Ḥātimī li-Abi ’l-Ṭayyib, a tract in the form of a dialogue between Aristotle and the poet al-Mutanabbī, who is caricatured and whose poetry is criticised. (This was allegedly followed by a Risāla Ḥāūmiyya, now lost, reversing al-Ḥātimī's previous position to praise al-Mutanabbī.)
 Fu'ād Afrām al-Bustānī (ed.), 'Ar-Risāla al-Ḥātimīya', Machriq, 29 (1931), 132-9, 196-204, 273-80, 348-55, 461-4, 623-32, 759-67, 854-9, 925-34 [also published as a single volume: Beirut: Imprimerie Catholique, 1931].
 O. Rescher (ed. and trans.), 'Die Risālet El-Hātimijje', Islamica, 2 (1926), 439-73 (a facsimile edition with translation).
 Yosef Tobi, 'The Hebrew Transcription of Risālat al-Hātimī: A Comparative Study Between Sayings Attributed to Aristotle and Poetic Verses Attributed to Mutanabbī (Cambridge, T.S. Arabic, 45.2)', in Between Hebrew and Arabic Poetry: Studies in Spanish Medieval Hebrew Poetry (Leiden: Brill, 2010), . Includes transcription and translation.
 Ḥilyat al-muḥāḍara ['the qualities of lecturing'].
 Yaakov Mashiah, 'The Terminology of Hebrew Prosody and Rhetoric with Special Reference to Arabic Origins' (unpublished Ph.D. dissertation, Columbia University, 1975), 
 Ḥilyat al-muḥāḍara, fī ṣinā‘at al-shi‘r, ed. by Ja‘far al-Kattānī (Baghdad, 1979)
 Seeger A. Bonebakker, 'Sariqa and Formula: Three Chapters from Ḥātimī's Ḥilyat al-Muḥāḍara’, Annali, Istituto Universitario Orientale di Napoli, 46 (1986), 367–89.
 Seeger A. Bonebakker, 'Four Chapters from the "Ḥilyat al-muḥāḍara" — Arabic Texts', Quaderni di Studi Arabi, 17 (1999), 29-52

Further reading
 Geert Jan van Gelder, 'The Poet as a Body-Builder: On a Passage from al-Ḥātimī's "Ḥilyat al-Muḥāḍara"', Journal of Arabic Literature, 13 (1982), 58–65.
 Yosef Tobi, 'Preliminary Study in Ḥilyat al-Muḥāḍara [ḤM] by Abū ʿAlī Muḥmmad al-Ḥātimī: The "Lost" Source of Moše Ibn Ezra for his Kitāb al-Muḥāḍara wa-al-Mudhākara [KMM]', in Between Hebrew and Arabic Poetry: Studies in Spanish Medieval Hebrew Poetry (Leiden: Brill, 2010), pp. 355–68 .

References

998 deaths
Year of birth unknown
10th-century Arabs
10th-century Arabic poets